The blue spruce (Picea pungens), also commonly known as green spruce, Colorado spruce, or Colorado blue spruce, is a species of spruce tree. It is native to North America, and is found in USDA growing zones 1 through 7. It is found naturally in Arizona, Colorado, Idaho, New Mexico, Utah and Wyoming. It has been widely introduced elsewhere and is used as an ornamental tree in many places far beyond its native range. The blue spruce has blue-green colored needles and is a coniferous tree.

Description
The tree can grow larger if the tip is cut when it is at least 3 years old. It is a columnar or conical evergreen conifer with densely growing horizontal branches. It has scaly grey bark on the trunk with yellowish-brown branches.

Male cones are found on the entire tree, whereas the female cones are found at the top of the tree. This helps to facilitate cross-pollination.

The specific epithet pungens means "sharply pointed", referring to the leaves.

The blue spruce is the state tree of Colorado.

Cultivation
Picea pungens and its many cultivars are often grown as ornamental trees in gardens and parks. It is also grown for the Christmas tree industry.

Pests and diseases
The blue spruce is attacked by two species of Adelges, an aphid-like insect that causes galls to form. Nymphs of the pineapple gall adelgid form galls at the base of twigs which resemble miniature pineapples and those of the Cooley's spruce gall adelgid cause cone-shaped galls at the tips of branches. The larva of the spruce budworm eat the buds and growing shoots while the spruce needle miner hollows out the needles and makes them coalesce in a webbed mass. An elongated white scale insect, the pine needle scale feeds on the needles causing fluffy white patches on the twigs and aphids also suck sap from the needles and may cause them to fall and possibly dieback. Mites can also infest the blue spruce, especially in a dry summer, causing yellowing of the oldest needles. Another insect pest is the spruce beetle (Dendroctonus rufipennis) which bores under the bark. It often first attacks trees which have blown over by the wind and when the larvae mature two years afterwards, a major outbreak occurs and vast numbers of beetles attack nearby standing trees.

The blue spruce is susceptible to several needle casting diseases which cause the needles to turn yellow, mottled or brown before they fall off. Various rust diseases also affect the tree causing yellowing of the needles as well as needle fall. Canker caused by Cytospora attacks one of the lower branches first and progressively makes its way higher up the tree. The first symptom is the needles turning reddish-brown and falling off. Meanwhile, patches of white resin appear on the bark and the branch eventually dies.

Rooting habits

Blue spruce seedlings have shallow roots that penetrate only 6.4 cm (2.5 inches) of soil during the first year. Although freezing can't damage much in blue spruce, frost will cause seedling loss. Shadows in late spring and early autumn minimize this frost heaving loss. Despite the shallow roots, blue spruce is able to resist strong winds. Five years before transplanting, the total root surface area of 2-meter-high trees was doubled by pruning the roots of blue spruce. It also increases the root concentration in drip irrigation pipeline from 40% to 60%, which is an advantage in landscape greening.

Cultivars

Common cultivars (those marked  have gained the Royal Horticultural Society's Award of Garden Merit):  
'Hoopsii'  
'Koster'
'Baby Blue Eyes'
'Baby Blue'

Uses
The Navajo and Keres Native Americans use this tree as a traditional medicinal plant and a ceremonial item, and twigs are given as gifts to bring good fortune. In traditional medicine, an infusion of the needles is used to treat colds and settle the stomach. This liquid is also used externally for rheumatic pains. Early people used their wood for building.

Gallery

Distributed soil types and topography 
Blue spruce generally exists on gentle uplands and sub irrigated slopes, in well-watered tributary drainage, extending down intermittent streams, and on lower northerly slopes.

Blue spruce always grow naturally in the soils which are in the order Mollisols, and the soil will also be in the orders histosols and inceptisols in a lesser extent.

Blue spruce is considered as a pioneer tree species in moist soil in Utah.

Climate 
Blue spruce usually grows in cool and humid climatic zones where the annual precipitation mainly occurs in the summer.

Blue spruce is most common in Colorado and the Southwest. The annual average temperature ranges from 3.9 to 6.1 degrees C (39 to 43 degrees F). And ranges from - 3.9 to - 2.8 degrees C (25 to 27 degrees F) in January. In July, the average temperature ranges from 13.9 to 15.0 degrees C (57 to 59 degrees F). The average minimum temperature in January ranges from - 11.1 to 8.9 degrees C (12 to 16 degrees F), and the average maximum temperature in July ranges from 21.1 to 22.2 C (70 to 72 degrees F). There is a frost-free period of about 55 to 60 days from June to August.

Annual mean precipitation generally vary from 460 to 610 mm (18 to 24 in). Winter is the season with the poorest rainfall, the precipitation is usually less than 20 percent of the annual moisture falling from December to March. And fifth percent of the annual precipitation occurs during the growing season of the plants.

Blue spruce is generally considered to grow best with abundant moisture. Nevertheless, this species can withstand drought better than any other spruce. It can withstand extremely low temperatures (-40 degrees C) as well. Furthermore, this species is more resistant to high insolation and frost damage compared to other associated species.

References

External links
Conifers.org: Picea pungens (blue spruce) description
Lady Bird Johnson Wildflower Center NPIN — Native Plant Information Network
Interactive Distribution Map of Picea pungens 
Picea pungens — U.C. Photo Gallery

Picea
Trees of North America
Trees of Canada
Trees of the United States
Trees of the Western United States
Trees of the South-Central United States
Trees of the Southwestern United States
Flora of the Rocky Mountains
Least concern flora of the United States
Symbols of Colorado
Plants used in traditional Native American medicine
Garden plants of North America
Ornamental trees
Plants described in 1879